Azad is a 2000 Indian Telugu-language superhero film written and directed by Thirupathisamy, and produced by C. Ashwini Dutt under Vyjayanthi Movies. It stars Nagarjuna Akkineni, Shilpa Shetty and Soundarya music composed by Mani Sharma. The film completed 100 days run in 4 centres and won four Nandi Awards. It was loosely remade in Tamil as Velayudham (2011) and in Kannada as Bhagath. Besides a Tamil remake, the film was dubbed into Tamil as Kurukshetram .

Plot 
Anjali, a journalist witnesses the murder of a fellow journalist who had discovered evidence against a mafia boss, Deva, and wants to sue him for his colleague's murder. Anjali is harassed by Deva when he discovers that she has the evidence. Deva is the most influential person in the region who runs Hindu Seva Samithi, but in reality, he is an undercover Islamic militant on a mission to release their terrorist group head imprisoned by the state administration. Deva is apparently a Hindu devotee who teaches the Bhagavad Gita to every human he meets. Anjali happens to see an accident in which a bunch of Deva's henchmen die. She takes this opportunity to create a character and names after the freedom fighter "Azad". She writes a letter that Azad has done this assassination to end crime in the city and state. The word spreads like wildfire that there is a man called "Azad", who is the rescuer of a common man.

A man named Chandra Sekhar Azad, has a widowed mother, a sister named Kaveri and a fiancée named Kanaka Mahalakshmi to take care of. As Kaveri's marriage is fixed, Azad goes to Hyderabad, to get the five lakhs he saved in a chit fund company. There, he happens to be involved in a few bomb-blasting incidents and rescue incidents and avoids all the bomb blasts and crimes without his knowledge. People start to think that he is the "Azad". Anjali meets him and explains to him about her mission of ending crime in the state.

However, Azad is more interested in retrieving money from the chit fund company and going back to his home to marry off his sister. He refuses to enact the role and take the responsibility of the legendary character "Azad". But later on, the chit fund company turns out to be bogus, which was managed by Deva, to generate finance for the smuggling of ammunition to Pakistan. Upon seeing the victims of the chit fund company committing suicide, Azad wears the mask of 'Azad' to stop Deva's mission. All these incidents make Deva extremely frustrated, so he kills and blasts Kaveri at her wedding. Azad also learns that Deva is not a Hindu, but an Indian Mujahideen terrorist under the guise of a Hindu and is on a mission to destroy India.

Deva demands the state administration for release of their militant leader in exchange for the lives of train passengers hijacked by Deva en route to Pakistan via Punjab, India. Sameer, an IPS officer requests for a chance to fight them off instead of exchanging lives who would kill more people if released. Deva provokes Sameer that being a Muslim man, he is opposing his jihad. After Deva tries shooting him with pakistan made bullet, he kills himself with his service revolver, just as freedom fighter Azad escaped the English bullet.

Azad now goes alone and gets badly beaten up by Deva. After Deva lashes that he would destroy India, Azad gets up and kills Deva. He then reunites with his family.

Cast

 Nagarjuna Akkineni as Chandra Sekhar Azad
 Shilpa Shetty as Mahalakshmi
 Soundarya as Anjali
 Raghuvaran as Deva/Dawood
 Prakash Raj as Inspector Saleem
 Brahmanandam as Thief
 Kalairani as Azad's mother
 Sujitha as Kaveri
 Nutan Prasad as Anjali's father
 Raghunatha Reddy as Mahalakshmi's father
 Tanikella Bharani as Kanaka Raju
 Ananth Babu as School teacher
 Venu Madhav as Citizen
 Dharmavarapu Subramanyam as Editor
 M. S. Narayana as Constable
 Banerjee as Banerjee
 L. B. Sriram as Sastry
 Narsing Yadav as Rowdy
 Chitti Babu
 Gundu Hanumantha Rao
 Indu Anand as Mahalakshmi's mother
 Rajashree Reddy as Doctor
 Likitha Kamini
 Urvasi Patil in an item number

Soundtrack

The music was composed by Mani Sharma. Music released on SUPREME Audio Company.

Awards
Nandi Awards - 2000
Second Best Feature Film - Silver – C. Ashwinidutt 
Best Story Writer – Thirupathisamy
Best Dialogue Writer – Trivikram Srinivas
Best Fight Master – Kanal Kannan

Other awards
Andhra Pradesh Film Journalists Association Award - 2000 – Nagarjuna

References

External links
 

2000 films
2000s Telugu-language films
Films about terrorism in India
Politics of Jammu and Kashmir
Journalism adapted into films
Films based on Indian novels
Films scored by Mani Sharma
Telugu films remade in other languages
Indian romantic action films
2000s romantic action films